Caelostomus distinctus is a species of ground beetle in the subfamily Pterostichinae. It was described by Brancsik in 1892.

References

Caelostomus
Beetles described in 1892